Bernardo Vergara (Pamplona, 1966) is a Spanish cartoonist.

Biography 
He began his career in the world of comics in the 1980s, in the fanzine of Pamplona Hamelín, and later, along with other artists of this fanzine, went to work with the comic magazine TMEO. In the early 1990s he also worked in magazines of publisher Ediciones B such as Mortadelo or Zipi y Zape. Later he worked for agencies, as well as newspapers such as Diario del Altoaragón, El Mundo, El País or Heraldo de Aragón.

In 1999 he joined the team of collaborators of El Jueves, for which he created the character of Urbano. Alongside José Luis Agreda he created for that magazine the strip Jaula Magna with jokes about the university world. For the children's magazine Míster K he created, alongside EnriqueCarlos, the strip Harry Pórrez, a Harry Potter parody.<ref>PONS, Álvaro (11/11/2005). Niños, La cárcel de papel.</ref> Also for El Jueves he created the series Los Ilegales, a satirical view of the problems of the illegal immigrants in Spain.

He collaborated with the daily newspaper Público with the strip Piso para cuatro and he publishes jokes for the online newspaper eldiario.es.

 Abandonment of El Jueves 

In June 2014, Vergara announced his departure from the magazine El Jueves after the editorial RBA not allowed to publish a cover with a joke which referenced the abdication of the king of Spain, Juan Carlos I. Other cartoonist also left the magazine. Those comic artist published on 18 June, the day before the coronation of Philip VI, an online comic with jokes about the event titled Orgullo y satisfacción''. He was later hired by the monthly satirical magazine Mongolia.

Work

References

External links 
 Vergara in Lambiek comiclopedia

1966 births
Living people
Spanish comics artists
Spanish comics writers
People from Pamplona